NGC 1032 is a spiral galaxy that is about 117 million light-years away in the constellation Cetus.

In January 2005 SN 2005E, a calcium-rich supernova, was discovered in NGC 1032.

References

External links
 
 

Spiral galaxies
Cetus (constellation)
1032
02147
10060